Choi Young-eun may refer to:

Choi Young-eun (figure skater)
Choi Young-eun (footballer)